L Morgan Lee is an American actress and singer. She was nominated for the 2022 Tony Award for Best Performance by a Featured Actress in a Musical for her performance in A Strange Loop on Broadway, making history as the first openly transgender actor to be nominated for a Tony Award.

Early life 
Lee grew up in suburban Maryland. She began performing in her early childhood by singing in her nursery school's talent show. She began studying voice at 14 at Duke Ellington School of the Arts in Washington, DC. At 17, she was a Top 10 Finalist for Wolf Trap's Catherine Filene Shouse Award for Classical Voice. She went on to study Musical Theater at the University of the Arts in Philadelphia, Pennsylvania.

Career 
Shortly after graduating from UArts, Lee moved to New York City and was quickly cast in a National tour. Next, she danced her way through Europe in a tour of Jesus Christ Superstar directed and choreographed by Baayork Lee. She went on to do a number of Off-Broadway, Regional shows, and tours. It was through a Facebook exchange in 2015 that Lee was invited to do a reading of A Strange Loop at the Musical Theatre Factory in New York City, New York. She continued with the show through its 2019 World Premiere Off-Broadway at Playwrights Horizons where she won an Obie Award and received a Lucille Lortel Award nomination for Outstanding Featured Actress in a Musical. 

In 2021, Lee traveled to the UK to play artist Lili Elbe in a musical adaptation of The Danish Girl being developed in London. 

Lee made her Broadway   debut in 2022 when A Strange Loop transferred to the Lyceum Theater. The show received rave reviews and went on to win the Tony Award for Best Musical. For her performance as Thought 1, Lee was nominated for her first Tony Award.

Discography

Cast & Concept recordings
 A Strange Loop – Original Cast Recording (2019)
 Soft Butter: A Trans Fantasia – Concept Recording (2019)
 A Strange Loop – Original Broadway Cast (2022)

Collaborative projects
 The Broadway Rainbow Lullaby Album (2021)
 Album (Joe Iconis) (2022)
 Her Sound: Volume 3 (2022)

Awards and nominations

References

External links 
 
 
 
 
 

Living people
Transgender actresses
Year of birth missing (living people)
University of the Arts (Philadelphia) alumni
Actresses from Maryland
American musical theatre actresses